Syed Abbas Ali Shah is a Pakistani politician who had been a member of the Provincial Assembly of the Punjab from August 2018 till January 2023.

Syed Abbas Ali Shah has completed his highschool from Aitchison College, Lahore. He has been politically active for quite a while and is the parliamentary secretary for law and parliamentary affairs.

Political career

He was elected to the Provincial Assembly of the Punjab as a candidate of Pakistan Tehreek-e-Insaf from Constituency PP-207 (Khanewal-V) in 2018 Pakistani general election.

References

Living people
Pakistan Tehreek-e-Insaf MPAs (Punjab)
Year of birth missing (living people)